Josh Batch (born 15 January 1991) is an English professional ice hockey defenceman currently playing for Cardiff Devils of the EIHL and the British national team.

References

External links

1991 births
Living people
Cardiff Devils players
Chelmsford Chieftains players
English ice hockey defencemen
Manchester Storm (2015–) players
Swindon Wildcats players
Sportspeople from Essex
British expatriate ice hockey people
English expatriate sportspeople in the United States
Expatriate ice hockey players in the United States